Caucasology, or Caucasiology refers to the historical and geopolitical studies of the Caucasus region. The branch has more than 150 years history. In 1972, the Caucasiological Center (renamed to International Caucasiological Center in 2000) was founded under the auspices of the Israel President Zalman Shazar.

See also
 Armenian studies
 Kartvelian studies
 Russian studies
 Turkish studies
 Cultural studies
 Area studies

External links
Tsu Institute of Caucasiology
International Caucasological Research Institute
International Caucasology Congress

 
Humanities
Cultural studies
Area studies
History of the Caucasus